Cabanal is a community in Carroll County in northwest Arkansas, United States. The community is located on Arkansas Highway 21, south of Berryville and north of Metalton.

The community post office was established in 1898 and closed in 1955.

References

Unincorporated communities in Carroll County, Arkansas
Unincorporated communities in Arkansas